Helsfyr is a subway station on the east side of the Oslo Metro system located in the borough of Helsfyr. The station is shared by the Furuset Line (Line 2), the Østensjø Line (Line 3) and the Lambertseter Line (Lines 1 and 4). Line 1 terminates at Helsfyr during weekends, late evenings, and vacations. The station is located between Ensjø in the west and Brynseng in the east.

Helsfyr is located underground. The entrance to the station is located within the perimeter of a bus terminal, and the surrounding localities consist mostly of office buildings and also some industrial establishments. An ice rink and concert stadium are located nearby at Valle-Hovin. Just northeast of the station is the cemetery Østre Gravlund (Eastern Cemetery), which includes the Jewish Cemetery.

References

External links

Oslo Metro stations in Oslo
Railway stations opened in 1966
1966 establishments in Norway